Gone Polka is an album by Jimmy Sturr, released through Rounder Records on September 25, 2001. In 2002, the album won Sturr the Grammy Award for Best Polka Album.

Track listing
 "Yellow Rose of Texas Polka" – 2:52
 "Sugar and Spice Polka" (Sturr) – 3:02
 "Music! Music! Music! Polka" (Baum, Weiss) – 2:07
 "Near the Town Polka" (Solek) – 2:05
 "Waltz Across Texas Waltz" (Tawil, Tubb, Tubb) – 2:57
 "Dancing Girl Oberek" – 2:15
 "Ricochet Polka" (Coleman, Darion, Gimble) – 3:22
 "Just Because Polka" (Robin, Shelton) – 2:17
 "Hop Scotch Polka" – 2:19
 "Big Mamou Polka" (Davis) – 2:44
 "Poor Girl Polka" (Wojnarwoski) – 2:57
 "On the Road Again Polka" (Nelson) – 2:10
 "Sing Sing Sing" (Louis Prima) – 3:33

Personnel

 Scott Alarik – liner notes
 Gene Bartkiewicz – accordion
 Mark Bernstein – bass
 Doyle Brown – visual coordinator
 Dennis Coyman – drums
 Wally Czerniawski – accordion, arranger
 Ray DeBrown – arranger
 Nick Devito – clarinet, alto saxophone, baritone saxophone
 Joe Donofrio – mixing
 Ken Harbus – trumpet
 Johnny Karas – clarinet, alto saxophone, vocals
 Brenda Lee – vocals
 Jean-Pierre LeGuillou – design
 Dr. Toby Mountain – mastering
 Willie Nelson – vocals
 Al Noble – trumpet
 Eric Parks – trumpet
 Al Piatkowski – accordion
 Tom Pick – producer, engineer, mixing
 Emil Shapach – assistant engineer
 Keith Slattery – piano
 Jimmy Sturr – producer, mixing
 Samir El Tawil – composer
 Frank Urbanovitch – fiddle, vocals
 Jim Uzwack – engineer
 Henry Will – arranger

See also
 Polka in the United States

References

2001 albums
Grammy Award for Best Polka Album
Jimmy Sturr albums
Rounder Records albums